Alison Kinnaird MBE, MA, FGE (born 30 April 1949) is a glass sculptor, Celtic musician, teacher and writer born in Edinburgh, Scotland. She is one of the foremost and most original modern glass engravers in Scotland.

Portrait

Her application to art college having been rejected, Kinnaird earned a MA in Celtic studies and archaeology at the University of Edinburgh, in the course of which she also studied copper wheel glass engraving with Harold Gordon in Forres,  having met him while on a family holiday there.

Kinnaird's glass engraving works are in many galleries and private collections. She uses lead and optical crystal. The techniques used by Kinnaird include copper-wheel engraving, cutting, sandblasting, acid etching and casting. Starting in a studio in the High Street, Edinburgh, her work won early recognition and was included in an exchange between the Edinburgh Festival Fringe and the Salzburg Fringe. Later, believing that the small physical size of works produced in traditional glass engraving confines their appreciation to a limited audience, she expanded the scale of her works by using flexible drive engraving and sandblasting, combined with the adventurous use of dichroic glass. More recently she has employed bonded coloured glass as her engraving medium.
 
Kinnaird is also a musician, a gift that led her to discover relationships between music and glass engraving, notably through designs based on Lissajous figures. She plays, teaches and lectures on the small Scottish harp also known as the clàrsach. She was one of the first acts signed to Temple Records during the 1970s and she has had eight albums released through the label. She worked with the Scottish music group Battlefield Band on their albums Music in Trust Vol I (1987) and Music in Trust Vol II (1988).

Kinnaird has written many books about traditional music and the small Scottish harp. Her first book on the subject was published in 1990 and is a collection of 24 harp tunes that she arranged. Tree of Strings (1992), written in collaboration with Keith Sanger, documents the history of the harp in Scotland and is the first book of its kind. The Lothian Collection (1995) has 25 harp tunes from the big houses and great families from East, West and Midlothian all arranged by Kinnaird. The Small Harp Tutor (1996) is a book about learning to play the small harp, which covers the history of the instrument, maintaining the instrument, arranging tunes and gives useful finger exercises. The book is accompanied by a 60-minute CD, which guides the learner from novice to more accomplished player. Kinnaird's most recent book is The North East Collection  which features tunes mainly from the 18th and 19th century arranged by herself.

In 1997, Kinnaird was awarded the MBE for her contribution and long standing service to art and music. In 2011 National Life Stories interviewed Kinnaird for their 'Craft Lives' archive. The interviews took place over three days and document her life from childhood to becoming a successful artist and musician. She has been recognised for her contributions to Scottish folk music and was inducted into the Scots Trad Music Awards – Hall of Fame in 2010.
 
Alison Kinnaird was married to the musician, producer and writer Robin Morton until his death. She has two children, Ellen and John.

Awards

 2010: MG Alba Scots Traditional Music Awards, Hall of Fame
 2004: Glass Sellers Award
 2002: Creative Scotland Award
 2001: Adrian Sassoon Award
 1998: CC Chelsea First Exhibitors Award
 1998: Inches Carr Crafts Bursary
 1997: MBE for services to art and music
 1987: Glass-Sellers Award
 1980: SDA/CCC Crafts Fellowship

Memberships 

 2003–2004: Member of the award panel for Creative Scotland Award
 1993–1996 Scottish Arts Council Crafts Committee
 Fellow of the Guild of Glass Engravers 
 1984–1987 BBC Broadcasting Council for Scotland 
 Contemporary Glass Society 
 Glass Art Society 
 Scottish Glass Society 
 Index of Selected Makers, Crafts Council

Teaching 
 Masterclasses, International Festival of Glass, Stourbridge, England
 Urban Glass, Brooklyn, NY 
 College of Art and Design, Wroclaw, Poland
 Northlands Creative Glass, Scotland 
 Corning Glass Studio, Corning NY, USA
 Frauenau, Germany

Selected exhibitions 

 2018 Berengo Gallery, Murano, Italy
 2017 Edinburgh International Festival Fringe, solo exhibition
 2017 Scottish Glass Society, Edinburgh
 2017 Celebrating 80, London Glassblowing Gallery
 2016 Unknown, Scottish Parliament to Kirkaldy Art Gallery (ongoing tour)
 2015 British Glass Biennale, Stourbridge
 2014 Edinburgh International Festival, solo show
 2013 SOFA, Chicago
 2013 Edinburgh International Fringe Festival, solo show
 2012 Luminesce, Linlithgow, Scotland, solo exhibition,
 2012 Fleming Collection, London
 2012 The Scottish Gallery, Edinburgh, solo exhibition
 2012 Travelling exhibition, Wroclaw, Jelenia Gora, Ostrow, Lesno, Poland
 2011 Johansfors, Kristallmuseum, Sweden 
 2011 British Studio Glass, Coburg 
 2010 Invited Artist, British Glass Biennale 
 2009 Urban Glass, NY, USA
 2008 The Cutting Edge, Royal Museums of Scotland
 2007 Invited Artist, Visual Arts Scotland, Royal Scottish Academy
 2006 British Glass Biennale, Stourbridge
 2006 Glasmuseet Ebeltoft, Denmark
 2006 Coburg Glaspreis Exhibition'
 2005 21st Century British Glass, London
 2004 Psalmsong, V&A London Museum
 2004 British Glass Biennale, Stourbridge
 2004 Broadfield House Glass Museum, Dudley
 2002 Art for Europe, Brussels
 2001 Art Glass Gallery, Santa Fe
 1999 Kaminesky Senov, Czech Republic
 1999 National Glass Centre, Sunderland
 1998 Contemporary Applied Arts, London 
 1996 British Glass, Prague
 1996 Contemporary Arts Centre, Utrecht 
 1988 Solo exhibition, Coleridge, London 
 1987 Group exhibition, Galerie de Vier Linden, Asperen, The Netherlands
 1984 Group exhibition, Habatat Gallery, Detroit, USA 
 1979 The Bowl, British Crafts Centre, London, organised by World Crafts Council
 1977 Salzburg Festival, Art Gallery, Salzburg, Austria.
 1975 Contemporary Scottish Artists, Exhibitions Centre, Edinburgh

Selected collections 

 2016 Eve, Museum of Decorative Arts in Prague
 2012 Standing Feathers, Aberdeen Art Gallery 
 2010 Adam and Eve, Shipley Art Gallery, Gateshead
 2008 Maze, National Museum of Scotland
 2005 Psalmsong, Scottish Parliament, Edinburgh
 2005 Streetwise I, Tutsek Foundation, Munich 
 2005 Streetwise II, Dundee Museum & Art Gallery
 2003 Portrait of Roy Dennis, Scottish National Portrait Gallery, Edinburgh
 2001 Evolve, Broadfield House Glass Museum
 2001 White Lies, Crafts Council Collection
 1995 Triptych, Victoria and Albert Museum, London 
 1989 Man into Seal, Corning Museum of Glass, New York City, USA
 1988 Ring of Crystal, Ring of Stone, Leicester Museum and Art Gallery, Leicester
 1987 Disc – Leap, Ulster Museum, Belfast 
 1986 Doors on the Past, National Museum of Scotland
 1986 Disc – She is Summer, Kelvingrove Museum and Art Gallery, Glasgow
 1980 Doors – engraved block, Scottish Development Agency – Scottish Crafts Collection, Edinburgh

Selected commissions 
 
 2017 Nativity Window, St Mary’s Church, Kenardington, Kent
 2016 Window, St Cross College, Oxford
 2015 Quaking Aspen Panels, Beverley Hills, California
 2014 Windows, Dornoch Cathedral
 2012 Donor Window, Scottish National Portrait Gallery
 2009 Self Portrait, Fitzwilliam Museum, Cambridge
 2007 Interface-Panels for Murano Hotel, Tacoma, USA
 2006 Butterfly Panels, Marchmont St Giles Church, Edinburgh 
 2004 Praise Window, Dornoch Cathedral
 2003 Portrait of Roy Dennis, National Portrait Gallery of Scotland
 2000 Millennium Commission, Broadfield House Glass Museum
 1993 British Film Institute Awards
 1992 Door panels, commissioned by Lord Bute of Mount Stuart
 1991 Alumnus of the Year Award, commissioned by Edinburgh University
 1990 Gift for His Imperial Highness, the Crown Prince of Japan, commissioned by Royal Bank of Scotland
 1989 Screen of 10 panels, commissioned by Lord Bute of Mount Stuart
 1986 Gift for HM the Queen Mother, commissioned by Royal College of Physicians
 1983 Duke of Edinburgh Design Award, commissioned by Alan Doe of Westland Helicopters
 1980 Wedding bowl for HRH the Prince of Wales, commissioned by The Scotsman newspaper
 1979 The Wealth of Nations presented to The London Institute of Banking & Finance in England, commissioned by Institute of Bankers in Scotland

Books 
 2013 Reflections – the Art of Alison Kinnaird, Kinmor Music 
 2011 Life Story recorded for British Library Crafts Lives series
 2011 Portrait of the Nation, Trustees of the Scottish National Galleries
 2008 20th Century British Glass, Charles Hajdamach, Antique Collectors Club 
 2007 Invited Contributor, V & A Museum, 150th  Anniversary Celebration Album
 2005 25 Years of New Glass Review, Corning Museum of Glass  
 2003 Contemporary International Glass, V & A Pub, Jennifer Hawkins Opie 
 2002 Artists in Glass, Late Twentieth Century Masters in Glass, Dan Klein, Mitchell Beazley 
 1999 Engraced Glass, Marilyn & Tom Goodearl, Antique Collectors Club 
 1996 Glass Art, Peter Layton, Black, University of Washington Press

Bibliography 
 2002: The North East Collection 
 1996: The Small Harp Tutor 
 1995: The Lothian Collection 
 1992: Tree of Strings

Discography 
 2004: The Silver String 
 1994: Mac-talla – Mairidh Gaol Is Ceol
 1992: The Harper's Land (with Ann Heymann)
 1990: The Quiet Tradition (with Christine Primrose)
 1988: The Scottish Harp 
 1988: Music in Trust Vol. 2 (with Battlefield Band)
 1986: Music in Trust Vol. 1 (with Battlefield Band)
 1979: The Harp Key – Crann Nan Teud  (Temple US Records)

References

External links 
 
 
 How to create stunning portraits on glass - BBC video in which Kinnaird demonstrates some of her techniques

1949 births
Living people
20th-century Scottish women artists
21st-century Scottish women artists
British glass artists
Glass engravers
Women engravers
Artists from Edinburgh
Alumni of the University of Edinburgh
Alumni of the Edinburgh College of Art
People associated with the University of Edinburgh School of History, Classics and Archaeology
Scottish folk musicians
Scottish writers about music
Members of the Order of the British Empire